The 1999 LSU Tigers football team represented Louisiana State University in the 1999 NCAA Division I-A football season.  Coached by Gerry DiNardo in his last year at LSU, the Tigers played their home games at Tiger Stadium in Baton Rouge, Louisiana.  LSU fired DiNardo before the final game of the season against conference opponent Arkansas after eight consecutive losses and named Assistant Coach Hal Hunter as interim head coach for the final game. DiNardo was given the opportunity to coach the game vs. Arkansas, but refused (in contrast to his predecessor at LSU, Curley Hallman, who coached the Tigers in their final two games of 1994 after being fired five years to the day prior to DiNardo's dismissal).

In Coach Hunter's only game as the team's head coach, unranked LSU (2-8, 0-7) dominated #17 Arkansas (7-3, 4-3) in their lone victory over a conference opponent that season. Former Michigan State University head football coach Nick Saban accepted LSU's offer and took over the team in December 1999.

This would be LSU's last losing season until 2021.

Schedule

Roster

References

LSU
LSU Tigers football seasons
LSU Tigers football